Derlan de Oliveira Bento (born 3 February 1996), simply known as Derlan, is a Brazilian footballer who plays as a central defender for Oita Trinita.

Career
Derlan abroad to Japan and signed J2 club, Oita Trinita for upcoming 2023 season.

Career statistics
.

Honours
Chapecoense
Campeonato Catarinense: 2020
Campeonato Brasileiro Série B: 2020

References

External links

1996 births
Living people
People from Nova Iguaçu
Brazilian footballers
Association football defenders
Campeonato Brasileiro Série A players
Campeonato Brasileiro Série B players
Campeonato Brasileiro Série D players
J2 League players
Fluminense FC players
Boavista Sport Club players
Paysandu Sport Club players
Grêmio Foot-Ball Porto Alegrense players
Criciúma Esporte Clube players
Associação Chapecoense de Futebol players
Guarani FC players
Oita Trinita players
Sportspeople from Rio de Janeiro (state)